In the Land of the Flabby Schnook is a Canadian virtual reality animated short film, directed by Francis Gélinas and released in 2020. The film tells the story of a young boy who is afraid of the dark, and his older sister's efforts to help him overcome his fears.

The film's voice cast includes Catherine Cyr, Saule Gélinas, Francis Gélinas, Lileina Joy, Monique Thomas and Daniel Judson.

The film premiered as part of the VR Expanded program at the 2020 Venice Film Festival. It was subsequently screened in the Immersed VR program at the 2020 Vancouver International Film Festival, where it received an honourable mention from the Immersed award jury, and at the 2021 online edition of the Cinequest Film & Creativity Festival, where it won the award for Best Virtual Reality Animation.

The film received a Canadian Screen Award nomination for Best Immersive Experience at the 9th Canadian Screen Awards in 2021.

References

2020 films
Virtual reality films
Canadian animated short films
Quebec films
2020s Canadian films